BDO (an acronym for Binder Dijker Otte) is  an international network of public accounting, tax, consulting and business advisory firms that provide professional services under the name BDO. It is the fifth-largest accounting network in the world. Global fee income of the member firms in the network for the year ended 30 September 2021, including the members of their exclusive alliances, totaled US$11.8 billion. 

Each BDO member firm is an independent legal entity in its own country. The network, founded in 1963 as Binder Seidman International Group by firms from Canada, Germany, the Netherlands, the UK and the US, is coordinated by BDO Global Coordination B.V., with an office in Zaventem, Belgium. In 1973, the organisation adopted the name BDO, made up from the initials of the three founding firms: Binder (UK), Dijker (Netherlands) and Otte (Germany).

Australia 
Established in 1975, BDO Australia has offices in Brisbane, Cairns, Sunshine Coast, Sydney, Melbourne, Hobart, Adelaide, Perth and Darwin. It offers financial services and business advisory services.

While starting as an association of independently owned accounting firms, BDO Australia has since undergone several significant merges that include:

1988 – BDO Nelson Parkhill and Parkhill Stirling merge to create BDO Nelson Wheeler. Local offices are established in each state.
2006 – BDO and Horwath networks merge in Australia.
2012 – BDO and PKF East Coast Practice (ECP) merge in Australia.
2020 – As the first phase of integrating into one Australian firm, BDO in Brisbane (including both Brisbane and Sunshine Coast offices), and ECP (Sydney and Melbourne) merge.

Canada 

BDO Canada is one of Canada's largest accounting services firms. Founded by James M. Dunwoody (affectionately known as "The Colonel" by BDO's employees) it opened its first location in the 1920s in Winnipeg, Manitoba. By the early 2000s, Dunwoody and BDO Ward Mallette, a firm based out of Toronto, had merged. The union also consolidated the firm's affiliation with BDO International, a global network of national accounting firms.

In 2007, BDO had 95 offices across Canada, with 1,200 professionals and over 300 partners. BDO's services run from assurance, accounting and taxation services to financial advisory and corporate recovery. The company has merged a number of times, including a merger announced in October 2009 with the accounting firm of Hudson LLP.

From 1 January 2010 'Dunwoody' was dropped from the company name to coincide with a global rebrand which saw all of the BDO member firms change their names to BDO. The rebrand, which included design, messaging, all of the separate global websites, marketing collateral and trickle-down implementation across the 110 country network took just over five months. The intention was to create a global consistency, so that the BDO network could be presented as a single entity.

Chile 

BDO Auditores & Consultores Ltda. is a Chilean member of the global network of BDO International. It has 3 offices in Santiago, Viña del Mar and Temuco, and more than 300 partners and staff. Among others, they provide services such as Audit, IFRS, BSO (Outsourcing), Tax & Legal, and Advisory.

China 

BDO China Shu Lun Pan CPAs ("Shu Lun Pan CPAs") was founded by ShuLun Pan in Shanghai in 1927. It was one of the earliest accounting firms in China.

Lixin Certified Tax Agents Co., Ltd. ("Lixin"), is a member firm of BDO International, with headquarters located in Shanghai. It is a professional tax agents company under the "LIXIN" brand. Approved by the State Administration for Industry and Commerce of the People's Republic of China (SAIC) and Shanghai Certified Tax Agents Association, BDO Lixin Tax was established by six leading A-level tax agent corporations from across China. The name of the enterprise's legal representative is Zilin Zou and the registered capital of enterprise is 50 million RMB. BDO Lixin Tax has obtained AAAAA level, which is the highest standard, from the China Certified Tax Agents Association.

In Hong Kong, BDO McCabe Lo was merged with K.L. Lee & Partners in 2005 and Shu Lun Pan Horwath Hong Kong in 2009. In 2010, the businesses of BDO Limited and Grant Thornton Hong Kong were also merged.

Ireland 
BDO Simpson Xavier is a partnership of chartered accountants in the Republic of Ireland that was formed by Anthuan Xavier and Dave Simpson in 1982. It is the Irish member firm of BDO International. The firm adopting the worldwide branding of BDO in 2009. The rebrand took just over five months. The intention was to create a global consistency, so that the BDO network could be presented as a single entity.

With offices throughout Ireland, the firm offers auditing, consultancy and tax services to organisations in the private and public sectors and is the 5th largest accountancy firm in Ireland. Revenues were €62 million for the year ending 28 February 2006, with average revenue per partner of €1.5 million.

Mauritius 

BDO Mauritius originates from DCDM, a firm founded in Mauritius in 1952. It is a firm of Chartered Accountants, registered with the Institute of Chartered Accountants in England and Wales. DCDM joined the BDO network in 2007 as BDO DCDM and as of 2010, became known as BDO Mauritius.

New Zealand 
BDO is one of the top five Chartered Accounting and Business Advisory firms in New Zealand.

Puerto Rico 

On July 10, 2019, former BDO Puerto Rico president Fernando Scherrer was indicted on federal charges related to the redirection of over $15 million in federal education funds, alongside former Puerto Rico Secretary of Education Julia Keleher and others.

BDO Puerto Rico was also retained by Puerto Rico's federal oversight board Junta de Control Fiscal to provide financial and consulting services to PREPA.

United Kingdom 
BDO LLP is a partnership of chartered accountants in the United Kingdom. 

In November 2018, BDO and Moore Stephens announced plans to merge their UK businesses, putting BDO ahead of Grant Thornton as the fifth-largest accountancy firm in the UK. The deal was completed in February 2019.

History

The firm was founded in 1903 as Stoy and Co by Fred Stoy. In 1919, Jack Hayward joined the firm and it became Stoy Hayward and Co. A series of mergers with Finnie and Co in 1992 and the BDO Binder Hamlyn offices that did not join Arthur Andersen or Deloitte & Touche in 1994 created BDO Stoy Hayward, which became the UK member of BDO International. The firm became a limited liability partnership in 2004.

The names 'Stoy Hayward' were dropped in October 2009, adopting the worldwide branding of BDO.

Criticism

BDO Stoy Hayward was criticised in their role as administrators for the collapsed Christmas hamper savings company Farepak. BDO Stoy Hayward used an 0870 premium rate phone service to provide information for victims of Farepak's collapse in 2016. They were initially also accused by The Observer of taking a share of the call revenue to pay for the administration; this accusation was later withdrawn.

Northern Rock

In September 2008, Andrew Caldwell, valuations partner at BDO Stoy Hayward, was appointed independent valuer for the stricken mortgage bank, Northern Rock plc. The UK government nationalised Northern Rock in February 2008, and the legislation effecting the nationalisation required an independent valuer to ascertain the value of the business at the point of nationalisation.  The role is a controversial one, as the legislation specifies in some detail the basis of valuation, and shareholder action groups claim that the valuation basis has been designed to minimise the compensation due.

United States

See also
 Accounting network
 Big Four accounting firms: KPMG, PwC, EY, Deloitte
 Crowe Global, Grant Thornton

References 

 
Business services companies established in 1964
Financial services companies established in 1964